Money tree may refer to:

Culture
 Money tree (myth), a Chinese myth
 Money tree, an offering given to the Buddha in temples, particularly in the Kathina festival

Plants
 Crassula ovata or Jade plant, also referred to as "money tree"
 Hydrocotyle vulgaris'''. a small, creeping, perennial, aquatic herb native to Europe, North Africa and West Asia.
 Lunaria, also referred to as "money plant", because the seedpods resemble a large coin
 Pachira aquatica, commercially sold under the name "money tree", also known as Malabar chestnut, Guiana chestnut, provision tree, or saba nut
 Pilea peperomioides, also known as "Chinese money tree"
 Theobroma cacao, because its beans were used as currency

Arts and entertainment
Literature
 The Money Tree, a children's book by Sarah Stewart
 The Money Tree Myth: A Parents' Guide to Helping Kids Unravel the Mysteries of Money, a book by Gail Vaz-Oxlade

Songs
 "Money Trees", by Kendrick Lamar
 "The Money Tree", by Margaret Whiting
 "The Money Tree", from The Act''
 "The Money Tree", by Blue October
 "The Money Tree", by Amy Krouse Rosenthal

Other uses
 Moneytree, a Seattle-based business

See also
 "All Around The Money Tree", a 1969 episode of American television detective series Mannix
 Money plant, several plants
 "Money Trees Deuce", a song by Jay Rock
 "There ain't no such thing as a free lunch", a popular adage
 Quantitative easing, an expansionary monetary policy